Emmanouil is the Greek version of the name Emanuel. It may refer to:

People
Emmanouil Antoniadis (1791–1863), revolutionary in the Greek War of Independence
Emmanouil Argyropoulos (1889–1913), Greek aviator
Emmanouil Benakis (1843–1929), Greek merchant and politician
Emmanouil Dadaoglou (died 1870), Greek anarchist
Emmanuel Kriaras (1906–2014), Greek lexicographer and philologist
Emmanouil Lampakis (1859–1909), Greek painter
Emmanouil Manousogiannakis (1853–1916), Greek Army officer during the Balkan Wars
Emmanouil A. Miaoulis (fl. 1800s), Greek naval officer
Emmanouil Mylonakis (born 1985), Greek water polo player
Emmanouil Pappas (1772–1821), leader of the Greek War of Independence in Macedonia
Emmanouil Peristerakis (fl. 1920), Greek sports shooter
Emmanouil Rhoides (1836–1904), Greek writer and journalist
Emmanouil Siopis (born 1994), Greek footballer
Emmanouil Tombazis (1784–1831), Greek naval captain
Emmanouil Tsouderos (1882–1956), Greek political and financial figure 
 Emmanuil Xanthos (1772–1852), one of the founders of the Filiki Eteria
Emmanouil Zymvrakakis (army general) (1861–1928), Greek army officer during World War I
Emmanouil Zymvrakakis (Gendarmerie general) (1856–1931), Cretan officer
Helen Fessas-Emmanouil (born 1943), Greek architect

Places
Emmanouil Pappas (municipality), a municipality in Central Macedonia, Greece
Emmanouil Pappas (village), a village in Central Macedonia, Greece

See also
Manolis, sometimes a contraction of this name

Greek masculine given names
Theophoric names